Audiovision was a Swedish metal band that produced two albums, the second in 2010.

History
Christian Liljegren, known for his work on Narnia and Divinefire, started up Audiovision during 2003 as a solo project. The first album The Calling was released in late 2004 in Europe and Japan, produced by Lars Chriss (Lion's Share, Road to Ruin). The guest list on The Calling featured  Bruce Kulick (KISS, Grand Funk Railroad), Jeff Scott Soto (W.E.T., Talisman, Yngwie Malmsteen, Journey), Mic Michaeli (Europe), Tony Franklin (Blur Murder, Whitesnake), Mats Levén (Treat, At Vance, Krux, Yngwie Malmsteen) and Sampo Axelsson (Crawley, Glenn Hughes, Lion's Share, Road to Ruin)

In 2009, Christian formed a touring and recording band and ended Audiovision as a studio project. During 2009, the first shows were played in Sweden, Norway and Germany, and, in the summer, Audiovision started to record their second album Focus with producer Erik Mårtensson (W.E.T., Eclipse) overseeing the work.

In January 2010, Audiovision joined Stryper on the European leg of their 25th anniversary tour, and played shows in both Germany and Sweden.

Members
Current members
 Christian Liljegren – vocals
 Torbjörn Weinesjö – guitars
 Olov Andersson – keyboards
 Simeon Liljegren – bass
 Thomas Weinesjö – drums

Discography
 The Calling (2005 Rivel Records)
 Focus (23 April 2010 Ulterium Records)
 Track listing: "Invitation", "Keep the fire burning", "We are not alone", "The son will come", "You are the reason", "Fruit of love", "We will go", "I will belong to you", "The way", "The gate", "Focus"
 Videos were released for the tracks "Invitation", "Keep the fire burning" and "Fruit of love"

References

External links
Official website (archived)
Audiovision at Rivel Records (archived)

Swedish power metal musical groups
Swedish Christian metal musical groups
Musical groups established in 2002
Musical quintets
2002 establishments in Sweden